Marie-Louise Laleyan (1935–2014) was an American architect.

Laleyan's professional experience as an architect spanned 48 years. She founded Laleyan Associates.

Experience 
Laleyan was born and educated in Bulgaria, and practiced architecture in Sofia, Bulgaria; Paris, France.   She moved to California, where she worked for Hart & Turner Architects (Sacramento, CA), Richard Neutra (Los Angeles, CA), and the San Francisco, CA firms of Claude Oakland and Associates, Anshen & Allen, Mario J. Ciamp, FAIA, and Paffard Keatinge Clay.

In 1977 Laleyan established her own architecture firm, Laleyan Associates in 1977 . The firm provides comprehensive services for remodeling projects and construction sites..

Professional affiliations 
Laleyan was an active member of the American Institute of Architects (AIA), and served on Northern California Chapter's Board of Directors. She co-founded Organization of Women Architects in 1972, co-authored the AIA Affirmative Action Plan in 1975, and co-chaired the AIA Task Force on Women in Architecture.

Publications 

 Architect With a Social Conscience, Daily Pacific Builder, October 31, 1986.
 Status of Women in the Architectural Profession: Task Force Report. Washington, DC: The American Institute of Architects, 1975. Co-authored with Judith Edelman, Patricia Schiffelbein, Joan Sprague, and Jean Young. The publication is cited in The Missing 400: On The Erasure of Women From the Urban Environment.

Legacy 
A collection of Laleyan's architectural drawings, construction files, and photographs were donated to International Archive of Women in Architecture at Newman Library, Virginia Tech.

References

1935 births
2014 deaths
American women architects